The Azerbaijan Cup 1993 was the second season of the annual cup competition in Azerbaijan. The competition started on 17 March 1993 and end with the final on 28 May 1993.

First round

|}

Second round

|}

Round of 16

|}

Quarterfinals

|}

Semifinals

|}

Final

References

External links
Azerbaijan Cup
Azerbaijan Cup '93 RSSSF

Azerbaijan Cup seasons
Cup
Azerbaijan Cup